The Croatian Peasant Party of Stjepan Radić ( or HSS SR) is a minor Croatian political party in Bosnia and Herzegovina.

In 2007, Croatian Peasant Party of Bosnia and Herzegovina and the New Croatian Initiative merged. The New Croatian Initiative was formed as a splinter group from the Croatian Democratic Union of Bosnia and Herzegovina by Krešimir Zubak. They were originally named HSS-NHI (CPP-NCI). After HSS-NHI underwent turmoil and internal divisions grew, a division of former HSS members led by Ljiljana Lovrić left the party and reestablished HSS in 2010. Shortly afterwards, another splinter group from HSS-NHI led by Anto Lozančić formed HSS Stjepan Radić. In 2014 general elections, they chose not to stand in the elections. HSS Stjepan Radić is a member party of the Croatian National Assembly.

In the 2020–24 legislative period, HSS SR has the majority in one municipality in the country, Croat-majority Dobretići.

Sources

Christian democratic parties in Europe
Political parties established in 1904
Croat political parties in Bosnia and Herzegovina
Agrarian parties
Political parties of minorities
Conservative parties in Bosnia and Herzegovina